Dabney Wharton Coleman (born January 3, 1932) is an American actor.

Coleman's best known films include 9 to 5 (1980), On Golden Pond (1981), Tootsie (1982), WarGames (1983), Cloak & Dagger (1984), The Beverly Hillbillies (1993), You've Got Mail (1998), Inspector Gadget (1999), Recess: School's Out (2001), Moonlight Mile (2002), and Rules Don't Apply (2016).
 
Coleman's television roles include the title character in Buffalo Bill (1983–1984), Burton Fallin in The Guardian (2001–2004), the voice of Principal Peter Prickly in Recess (1997–2001), and Louis "The Commodore" Kaestner in Boardwalk Empire (2010–2011). He has won one Primetime Emmy Award from six nominations and one Golden Globe Award from three nominations.

Career

Coleman is a character actor with roles in well over 60 films and television programs to his credit. He trained with Sanford Meisner at the Neighborhood Playhouse School of the Theater in New York City from 1958 to 1960.

He played Dr. Leon Bessemer with Bonnie Scott as his wife Judy, neighbors and friends of the protagonist in Season 1 of That Girl. Noted for his moustache which he grew in 1973, he appeared in the sitcom wearing horn-rimmed glasses and with no facial hair. Other early roles in his career included a U.S. Olympic skiing team coach in the 1969 Downhill Racer, a high-ranking fire chief in The Towering Inferno (1974), and a wealthy Westerner in Bite the Bullet (1975). He portrayed an FBI agent in Attack on Terror: The FBI vs. the Ku Klux Klan (1975).

He landed the main antagonist part of Franklin Hart, Jr., a sexist boss on whom three female office employees get their revenge in the 1980 film 9 to 5. It was this film that established Coleman in the character type with which he is most identified, and has frequently played since – a comic relief villain. Coleman followed 9 to 5 with the role of the arrogant, sexist, soap opera director in Tootsie (1982). He broke from this type somewhat in other film roles. He appeared in the feature film On Golden Pond (1981), playing the sympathetic fiancé of Chelsea Thayer Wayne (Jane Fonda). He also played a military computer scientist in WarGames (1983), and, in 1984, he played a dual role as a loving, but busy father, as well as his son's imaginary hero, in  Cloak & Dagger. He played an aging cop who thinks he is terminally ill in the 1990 comedy Short Time.

Over the years, Coleman has shifted between roles in serious drama and comedies, the latter of which often cast him as a variation of his 9 to 5 character. Coleman received his first Emmy nomination for his lead role, as a skilled, but self-centered TV host, in the critically acclaimed, though short-lived, TV series Buffalo Bill. In 1987, he received an Emmy Award for his role in the television film Sworn to Silence. Coleman played a con artist Broadway producer in The Muppets Take Manhattan (1984), a lisping Hugh Hefner-ish magazine mogul in the comedy Dragnet (1987), Bobcat Goldthwait's boss in the 1988 talking-horse comedy Hot to Trot, and befuddled banker Milburn Drysdale in the feature film The Beverly Hillbillies (1993), the last of which reunited him with 9 to 5 co-stars Lily Tomlin and Dolly Parton. Continuing his streak of comic foils, Coleman played Charles Grodin's sleazy boss, Gerald Ellis, in Clifford (1994), co-starring Martin Short.

From 1997 to 2001, Coleman provided the voice of Principal Prickly on the animated series Recess. He also played a philandering father in You've Got Mail (1998). Coleman appeared as a casino owner in 2005's Domino. He received acclaim as Burton Fallin in the TV series The Guardian (2001–2004). For two seasons, from 2010 to 2011, Coleman was a series regular on HBO's Boardwalk Empire. His most recent roles were a small part in Warren Beatty's Howard Hughes comedy Rules Don't Apply in 2016, and a guest role as Kevin Costner's dying father in Yellowstone, in 2018.

On November 6, 2014, Coleman received a star on the Hollywood Walk of Fame.

Personal life
Coleman resides in the Los Angeles neighborhood of Brentwood. He attended Virginia Military Institute, and the University of Texas at Austin. He was drafted in the United States Army in 1953 and served in Europe. He has been married and divorced twice. He was married to Ann Courtney Harrell from 1957 to 1959 and Jean Hale from 1961 to 1984. He has four children, including three by Hale: Kelly, Randy and Quincy.

In 1998, Coleman worked with fellow actor Bronson Pinchot at the Biltmore Estate in Asheville, North Carolina, to help protect local forests and helped lead a campaign to educate others on how to care for and protect forests nationwide.

Coleman is an avid tennis player, winning celebrity and charity tournaments. He played mainly at the Riviera Country Club as well as in local tournaments. His favorite sports team is the St. Louis Browns, which are now the Baltimore Orioles.

Filmography

Film

Television

Awards and nominations

References

External links
 
 
 

1932 births
Living people
American male film actors
American male stage actors
American male television actors
American male voice actors
Best Musical or Comedy Actor Golden Globe (television) winners
Outstanding Performance by a Supporting Actor in a Miniseries or Movie Primetime Emmy Award winners
Male actors from Austin, Texas
Neighborhood Playhouse School of the Theatre alumni
20th-century American male actors
21st-century American male actors
Virginia Military Institute alumni
University of Texas School of Law alumni
People from Brentwood, Los Angeles
United States Army soldiers